Professional Football Club Burgas was a Bulgarian association football club based in Burgas. The club was formed in 2009 and was dissolved in 2015 after union with Neftochimic Burgas.

Club colours

Kit history

History

Master Burgas (2009–2014)

The club was founded in 2009 as Football Club Master. In their debut 2010–11 season, they finished first in the Regional Football Group Burgas and qualified for the South-East V AFG promotion playoffs. On June 19, 2011, Master defeated Rodopi Momchilgrad 7–1 to earn promotion to the South-East V AFG.

During the 2011–12 season the team finished 6th in the division, and in the following year barely missed out on promotion by finishing 3rd overall. In season 2013–14 they finished 2nd, after narrowly losing the title race to FC Sozopol. On June 19, 2014 the BFU confirmed Benkovski Byala's withdrawal from the 2014–15 B PFG and officially invited Master Burgas to take their spot as the 2nd placed team in the Southeast V AFG.

PFC Burgas (2014–2015)
On June 22 the club announced it has accepted the invitation, and in addition will change its name to PFC Burgas and switch colors from red and white to blue and white, similar to the flag of Burgas.

Honours
Bulgarian V Group:
 Runners-up (1): 2013–14

Historical achievements

Historical names

Performance by seasons
{|class="wikitable"
|- style="background:#efefef;"
! Season
! Division
! Pos.
! Pl.
! W
! D
! L
! GS
! GA
! P
! Cup
! Notes
|-
|2009–10
|Regional B Division Burgas
|  style="text-align:right; background:lime;"|1
|align=right|28||align=right|28||align=right|0||align=right|0
|align=right|?||align=right|?||align=right|84
||
|Promoted
|-
|2010–11
|Regional A Division Burgas
|  style="text-align:right; background:lime;"|1
|align=right|26||align=right|24||align=right|1||align=right|1
|align=right|89||align=right|13||align=right|73
||
|Promoted
|-
|2011–12
|V AFG
|  align=right |6
|align=right|34||align=right|17||align=right|8||align=right|9
|align=right|45||align=right|34||align=right|59
||
|
|-
|2012–13
|V AFG
|align=right |3
|align=right|34||align=right|19||align=right|10||align=right|5
|align=right|53||align=right|25||align=right|67
||1/16
|
|-
|2013–14
|V AFG
|  style="text-align:right; background:lime;"|2
|align=right|32||align=right|26||align=right|2||align=right|4
|align=right|92||align=right|21||align=right|80
||Preliminary round
|Promoted
|-
|2014–15
|B PFG
|align=right |7
|align=right|30||align=right|11||align=right|10||align=right|9
|align=right|34||align=right|30||align=right|43
||1/16
|
|-
|}

Managers
 Panayot Gorov (2009–11)
 Neno Nenov (2011–13)
 Angel Stoykov (2013–14)
 Radostin Kishishev (2015)

Chairman history

References

External links
 Club profile at bgclubs.eu

2009 establishments in Bulgaria
Association football clubs disestablished in 2015
Defunct football clubs in Bulgaria
Football clubs in Burgas